Brent Hughes (born June 17, 1943) is a Canadian former ice hockey defenceman.

Career 
During his career, Hughes played in the NHL for the Los Angeles Kings, Philadelphia Flyers, St. Louis Blues, Detroit Red Wings, and Kansas City Scouts. He also played in the World Hockey Association with the San Diego Mariners and Birmingham Bulls.

In his NHL career, Hughes played in 435 games, scoring 15 goals and 117 assists. In the WHA, he appeared in 268 games, scoring 23 goals and 
79 assists.

Personal life 
Hughes married Sandy Lindemuth in 1984. He has three children from a previous marriage.

Career statistics

Regular season and playoffs

External links
 

1943 births
Living people
Baltimore Clippers players
Binghamton Dusters players
Birmingham Bulls players
Canadian ice hockey defencemen
Cincinnati Stingers (CHL) players
Detroit Red Wings players
Ice hockey people from Ontario
Kansas City Scouts players
Los Angeles Kings players
Sportspeople from Clarington
Philadelphia Flyers players
Pittsburgh Hornets players
Quebec Aces (AHL) players
St. Catharines Black Hawks players
St. Catharines Teepees players
St. Louis Blues players
San Diego Mariners players
Springfield Kings players
Toronto Marlboros players
20th-century Canadian people